Ochakiv Raion was a subdivision of Mykolaiv Oblast of Ukraine. Its administrative center was the city of Ochakiv, which was incorporated separately as a city of oblast significance and did not belong to the raion. The raion was abolished on 18 July 2020 as part of the administrative reform of Ukraine, which reduced the number of raions of Mykolaiv Oblast to four. The area of Ochakiv Raion was merged into Mykolaiv Raion. The last estimate of the raion population was 

At the time of disestablishment, the raion consisted of two hromadas, 
 Chornomorka rural hromada with the administration in the selo of Chornomorka;
 Kutsurub rural hromada with the administration in the selo of Kutsurub.

References

Former raions of Mykolaiv Oblast
1923 establishments in Ukraine
Ukrainian raions abolished during the 2020 administrative reform